Salmabad (also Romanized as Salmābād; also known as Salm Abad Barakooh, Sar-e Kārīz, and Sar-i-Kārīz) is a village in Barakuh Rural District, Jolgeh-e Mazhan District, Khusf County, South Khorasan Province, Iran. At the 2006 census, its population was 463, in 122 families.

References 

Populated places in Khusf County